Alessandro Vieira (born 3 April 1975) sometimes better known as Delegado Alessandro Vieira is a federal senator of Brazil representing the state of Sergipe. Although born in Rio Grande do Sul, he has spent his political career representing Sergipe, and was previously deputy general of the civil police in the state from 2016 to 2017.

Personal life
Vieira is married with three children. He has been a member of the civil police in Sergipe for 17 years.

Political career
Vieira was appointed deputy general of the civil police in the state of Sergipe by then governor Jackson Barreto on 22 February 2016. On 18 April 2017 however Vieira, along with João Batista the deputy general of fire control, were dismissed by Barreto.

Vieira ran for a seat in the senate from Sergipe in the 2018 Brazilian general election, and was elected with 474,449 votes or 25.95% of the ballots cast. He ran for office under the banner of the Sustainability Network. In December 2018 however Vieira along with other sustainability network politicians joined the Popular Socialist Party.

Anti-corruption was the major theme of Vieira's election campaign. Vieira is a strong supported of gun rights in Brazil, which was also one of the key topic of the campaign. In particular he is in favor of concealed carry and loosening the restriction on what type of guns Brazilians can buy.

References

|-

1975 births
Living people
People from Passo Fundo
Brazilian police officers
Sustainability Network politicians
Cidadania politicians
Members of the Federal Senate (Brazil)
Gun rights advocates